Eve's Necklace is a 2010 American thriller film written and directed by Daniel Erickson and featuring the voice of John Hawkes.  The film uses mannequins as the actors.

Premise
A deadly threat in the present and a dark secret from the past imperil a young couple in this first-ever motion picture with an all-mannequin cast.

Cast
 Veronica Erickson as Eva
 John Hawkes as William
 Janet Hurley Kimlicko as The Waitress / Radio Host
 Zane Rockenbaugh as Thief
 Kevin Simon as Ramon
 Johnny Coleman Walker as Jeremy
 Cyndi Williams as Janis

References

External links
 
 

American thriller films
2010s English-language films
2010s American films